The FIL European Luge Championships 1988 took place in Königssee, West Germany for a record fifth time after hosting the event previously in 1967, 1972, 1973, and 1977. The mixed team event debuted at these championships with two runs from men's singles, two runs from women's singles, and one run from men's doubles.

Men's singles

Women's singles

Men's doubles

Mixed team

Medal table

References
Men's doubles European champions
Men's singles European champions
Mixed teams European champions
Women's singles European champions

FIL European Luge Championships
1988 in luge
Luge in Germany
1988 in German sport